A Wildlife refuge in Brazil is a type of strictly protected area of Brazil defined by law. 
The purpose of the wildlife refuge is to ensure survival or reproduction of a species or community of flora or fauna, with access rules defined by the administrative agency.

Definition

In Brazil a wildlife refuge is one of the Integral Protection Units defined by Article 13 of Law No. 9,985 of 18 July 2000, National System of Conservation Units (SNUG).
The refuges have the objective of protecting natural environments to ensure conditions for survival or reproduction of species or communities of local flora and local or migratory fauna.
They can also be defined for natural monuments.
A wildlife refuge may include privately owned land if the goals are not incompatible with the use of the land and natural resources by the owners, but the land may be expropriated if there is a conflict.
Access for scientific research requires prior authorization from the administrative agency.
Rules for public access are also defined by the agency.

Selected list

Notes

Sources

 

Types of protected area of Brazil
Environmental law in Brazil
Lists of protected areas of Brazil